Neotephritis mundelli is a species of tephritid or fruit flies in the genus Neotephritis of the family Tephritidae.

Distribution
Brazil.

References

Tephritinae
Insects described in 1936
Diptera of South America